Earthscore is a notational system that enables collaborating videographers to produce a shared perception of environmental realities. The system optimizes the use of video and television in the context of the environmental movement by incorporating the cybernetic ideas of Gregory Bateson and the semiotics of Charles Sanders Peirce. The intent of the system is to generate human behaviors that comply with the self-correcting mechanisms of the
Earth. Earthscore has been studied and utilized by university students and academics worldwide since 1992.

Earthscore was developed and created by The New School professor and artist Paul Ryan, and originally published by NASA in 1990.

Components
In its most complete and succinct iteration, Earthscore is a notational system with five components. These components are:
 Three Comprehensive Categories of Knowledge: The categories of firstness, secondness, and thirdness
 The Relational Circuit: A circuit that organizes the categories of firstness, secondness, and thirdness in unambiguous, relative positions
 Threeing: A formal, teachable version of cooperation
 The Firstness of Thirdness: A spontaneous, intuitive appreciation of a pattern in nature
 The Semiotic System for Interpretation: A process of generating signs to approach knowledge

Three Comprehensive Categories of Knowledge

Using the trikonic categories of firstness, secondness, and thirdness developed by American philosopher Charles Sanders Peirce, Earthscore splits knowledge into three modes of being: firstness (positive quality), secondness (fact), and thirdness (laws that will govern facts in the future), and defines these categories as "a theory of everything".

Firstness is positive quality in the realm of spontaneity, freshness, possibility, and freedom. Earthscore defines firstness as being "as is", without regard for any other. Examples include: the taste of banana, warmth, redness, and feeling gloomy.

Secondness is a two-sided consciousness of effort and resistance engendered by being up against brute facts. Earthscore defines secondness as the "facticity", or "thisness", of something, as it exists, here and now, without rhyme or reason. Examples include: pushing against an unlocked door and meeting silent, unseen resistance.

Thirdness mediates between secondness and firstness, between fact and possibility. Earthscore defines thirdness as the realm of habit and laws that will govern facts in the future, and posits that a knowledge of thirdness can allow predictions of how certain future events will turn out. It is an 'if...then' sort of knowledge. Thirdness consists in the reality that future facts of secondness will conform to general laws.

The Relational Circuit

The relational circuit is a self-penetrating, tubular continuum with six unambiguous positions which attempts to supply a topological continuum to the trikonic categories. The circuit organizes differences in terms of firstness, secondness, and thirdness, and three "in-between" positions that connect them within the continuum. The relational circuit is to the Earthscore System what the staff and bars are to classical music notation, and is the basis of the third component, threeing.

Threeing

Threeing is a practice in which three people take turns playing three different roles; initiator, respondent and mediator, in an attempt to solve relational confusion. The roles correspond to the categories of firstness, secondness, and thirdness. Through role playing, the three individuals interact with each other spontaneously and recursively, following the relational circuit.

Threeing is further broken down into ten different subsections:

 Profiling Skills and the Talking Stick
 Diagnosing Relational Problems
 Dividing the Tasks
 Making Decisions
 Reading Charles Peirce
 Imitating Sherlock Holmes
 Cultivating Creativity
 Solving Problems
 Planning to Three
 Exploring the Yoga of Threeing

The Firstness of Thirdness

Earthscore utilizes the Firstness of Thirdness as a means of creativity, in an attempt to imagine an ecologically sustainable life before living it. By incorporating pure firstness as the realm of spontaneity, Earthscore uses the disciplines of Zen, yoga, and T'ai chi to cultivate the human capacity to be comfortable in pure firstness and yield new insights and visions.

The Semiotic System for Interpretation

Earthscore approaches knowledge as a process of generating signs, and incorporates the semiotic system of Charles Sanders Peirce consistent with the trikonic categories: A sign (firstness) representing an object (secondness) for an interpretant (thirdness). Earthscore exfoliates the threefold division into  a sixty-six-fold classification of signs that is inclusive of everything in nature, in order to systematize both interdisciplinary and multimedia representations of ecosystems.

See also

 Communication studies
 Cultural studies
 Critical theory
 Cybernetics
 Encodings
 Information theory
 International Association for Semiotic Studies
 Linguistics
 Logic
 Meaning
 Media studies
 Semiotic elements and classes of signs (Peirce)
 Semiotic information theory
 Semiotic Society of America

References
Bibliography

 Ryan, Paul (2009). The Three Person Solution. Eprint.
 Shook, John. (2005). "Bateson, Gregory", Dictionary American Philosophers.
 Strate/Wachtel. (2005). "McLuhan and Earthscore", The Legacy of McLuhan.
 Ryan, Paul (2005). "Bateson, Peirce and the Three-Person Solution", American Semiotic Society Journal.
 Clarke, D. S. (2003). Sign Levels. Dordrecht: Kluwer.
 Chandler, Daniel. (2001/2007). Semiotics: The Basics. London: Routledge.
 Ryan, Paul (1997). Fire Water Father. New York City: Earth Group.
 Ryan, Paul (1993). Video Mind, Earth Mind. New York City: Peter Lang Publishers.
 Ryan, Paul (1991). "A Sign of itself", On Semiotic Modeling. New York City: Eds. Anderson/Merrell
 Clarke, D. S. (1987). Principles of Semiotic. London: Routledge & Kegan Paul.
 Ryan, Paul (1974). Cybernetics of the Sacred. New York City: Doubleday Anchor.
 Peirce, C.S. (1867), "On a New List of Categories", Proceedings of the American Academy of Arts and Sciences 7 (1868), 287‚Äì298. Presented, 14 May 1867. Reprinted (Collected Papers, vol. 1, paragraphs 545‚Äì559), (The Essential Peirce, vol. 1, pp. 1‚Äì10), (Chronological Edition, vol. 2, pp. 49‚Äì59), Eprint.
 Peirce, C.S. (1885), "One, Two, Three: Fundamental Categories of Thought and of Nature", Manuscript 901;  the Collected Papers, vol. 1, paragraphs 369-372 and 376-378 parts; the Chronological Edition, vol. 5, 242-247

Notes

External links
 

Cybernetics
Environmental mass media
Environmentalism
Media studies
Semiotics